Décio Pignatari (August 20, 1927 – December 2, 2012) was a Brazilian poet, essayist and translator.

Early life and education 
Born in Jundiaí in 1927, Pignatari began conducting experiments with poetic language, incorporating visuals elements and the fragmentation of words in the 1950s. Such verbal adventures culminated in concretism, aesthetic movement that he co-founded with Augusto and Haroldo de Campos, with whom he edited the journals Noigandres and Invention and published the Theory of Concrete Poetry (1965).

Career 
As a theorist of communication and semiotics, Pignatari translated works of Marshall McLuhan and published the essay Information, Language and Communication (1968). His poetic work can also be read in Poesia Pois é Poesia (Poetry because it's Poetry) (1977).

Pignatari published translations of Dante Alighieri, Goethe and Shakespeare, among others, gathered in Portrait of Love when Young (1990) and 231 poems. He also published a volume of stories The Face of Memory (1988) and the novel Panteros (1992), as well as a work for theater, Céu de Lona (Sailcloth Sky).

He died in São Paulo of a respiratory illness on December 2, 2012.

References

External links 
Official site (in Portuguese)

1927 births
2012 deaths
Brazilian male poets
Semioticians
People from Jundiaí
University of São Paulo alumni
Academic staff of the University of São Paulo
Tropicália
Translators to Portuguese
20th-century Brazilian poets
20th-century translators
20th-century Brazilian male writers
Translators of Dante Alighieri
Translators of Johann Wolfgang von Goethe
Translators of William Shakespeare
Visual poets